Vincenzo Pagano, C.R. (1572–1644) was a Catholic prelate who served as Bishop of Acerra (1606–1644).

Biography
Vincenzo Pagano was born in Naples, Italy in 1572 and ordained a priest in the Congregation of Clerics Regular of the Divine Providence.
On 20 November 1606, he was appointed during the papacy of Pope Paul V as Bishop of Acerra.
He served as Bishop of Acerra until his death in 1644.

References

External links and additional sources
 (for Chronology of Bishops) 
 (for Chronology of Bishops) 

17th-century Italian Roman Catholic bishops
Bishops appointed by Pope Paul V
1572 births
1644 deaths
Clergy from Naples
Theatine bishops